Nathalie Petrowski (born 1954) is a French-born Canadian journalist and writer living in Quebec.

She was born in Paris, lived in the Lorraine region and came to Canada at the age of five. She attended the Collège International Marie de France and went on to receive a bachelor's degree in Communications from Concordia University in 1975. She began working for Le Journal de Montréal, joining Le Devoir in 1976, where her work appeared in the culture section. She also worked on television and radio. She joined La Presse in 1992.

Her 1995 novel Maman last call was adapted by Petrowski for a 2005 film of the same name directed by François Bouvier. The film was nominated for a Genie Award in 2006 for best adapted screenplay.

She has written scripts for the television series Miss Météo and wrote the screenplay for the 2011 film Gerry.

Her spouse is the radio host Michel Lacombe.

Selected works 
 Il restera toujours le Nebraska, novel (1990)
 Jean-Claude Lauzon, le poète (2006)

References

External links 
 

1954 births
Living people
French emigrants to Canada
Concordia University alumni
Canadian women novelists
Canadian women screenwriters
20th-century Canadian novelists
20th-century Canadian women writers
21st-century Canadian screenwriters
21st-century Canadian women writers
20th-century Canadian journalists
21st-century Canadian journalists
Canadian newspaper reporters and correspondents
Canadian television reporters and correspondents
Canadian radio reporters and correspondents
Canadian women television journalists
Canadian women radio journalists
Canadian television writers